The 2018 Liga 3 Regional Round was played from 24 September to 15 November 2018. A total of 69 teams competed in the regional round to decide 12 of the 32 places in the national round of the 2018 Liga 3.

Teams
The following 69 teams entered the regional winner route divided into seven regions:
 

Note:
 BOLD: Winner of each provincial league.

Schedule
The schedule of each round were as follows.

Regional round

Sumatra
A total of 13 teams played in Sumatra regional round. Four best teams from this region advanced to preliminary round. This region was played from 29 September – 21 October 2018.

|+First round

|+Second round

Java
A total of 29 teams played in Java regional round. Eight best teams from this region advanced to preliminary round. This region was played from 24 September – 27 October 2018.

|+First round

|+Second round

Kalimantan
A total of five teams played in Kalimantan regional round. Three best teams from this region advanced to preliminary round. This region was played from 3–10 October 2018.

Sulawesi
A total of eight teams play in Sulawesi regional round. Three best teams from this region advanced to preliminary round. This region was played from 1 October – 6 November 2018.

|+First round

|+Second round

|+Play-off for advance

Lesser Sunda Islands
A total of four teams played in Lesser Sunda Islands regional round. Two best teams from this region advanced to preliminary round. This region was played from 6–20 October 2018.

Maluku
A total of two teams played in Maluku regional round. The best team from this region advanced to preliminary round. This region was played from 6–21 October 2018.

Papua
A total of eight teams play in Papua regional round. Three best teams from this region advanced to preliminary round. This region was played from 1 October – 3 November 2018.

|+First round

|+Second round

|+Play-off for advance

Preliminary round
A total of 24 teams played in this round. This round was played from 6–15 November 2018.

Qualified teams

The following teams qualified from regional route for the national round.

Notes

References

External links
 2018 Liga 3 fixtures at PSSI website

Liga 3
Liga 3
Liga 3